Suckley railway station was a station in Suckley, Worcestershire, England. The station was opened on 1 March 1878 and closed on 7 September 1964.

References

Sources

Further reading

Disused railway stations in Worcestershire
Railway stations in Great Britain opened in 1878
Railway stations in Great Britain closed in 1964
Former Great Western Railway stations
Beeching closures in England